Florence Lake School No. 3 was listed on the National Register of Historic Places in 2011.  It is located approximately 10 miles north of Wing, North Dakota off ND 14.

It was built as Sterling School No. 2 in 1917.  It is a small prairie schoolhouse that was moved to Florence Lake in 1937 after the preceding school burned.

References

School buildings on the National Register of Historic Places in North Dakota
Schools in Burleigh County, North Dakota
School buildings completed in 1917
National Register of Historic Places in Burleigh County, North Dakota
1917 establishments in North Dakota